Netherlands sent 25 athletes to the 1978 European Athletics Championships which took place 29 August–3 September 1978 in Prague. Netherlands won no medals at the Championships.

References 

Nations at the 1978 European Athletics Championships
Netherlands at the European Athletics Championships
1978 in the Netherlands